The 1946 National Division was the 9th edition of the Turkish National Division. Fenerbahçe won their 5th title.

Istanbul qualifying round
Top four in İstanbul played a mini league to decide which two İstanbul clubs would play in the Milli Eğitim Kupası.

Participants

Beşiktaş - Istanbul Football League, 1st
Fenerbahçe - Istanbul Football League, 2nd
Gençlerbirliği - Ankara Football League, 1st
Muhafızgücü - Ankara Football League, 2nd
UDV Göztepe
Kayagücü

League standings

Results

References
 Erdoğan Arıpınar; Tevfik Ünsi Artun, Cem Atabeyoğlu, Nurhan Aydın, Ergun Hiçyılmaz, Haluk San, Orhan Vedat Sevinçli, Vala Somalı (June 1992). Türk Futbol Tarihi (1904-1991) vol.1, Page(83-84), Türkiye Futbol Federasyonu Yayınları.

Turkish National Division Championship seasons
1945–46 in Turkish football
Turkey